A national university is generally a university created or managed by a government, but which may at the same time operate autonomously without direct control by the state.

National University may also refer to:

Australian National University
National University, Bangladesh
National University of Colombia
National University of El Salvador
Indira Gandhi National Open University, India
National University of Ireland
National University (Philippines)
Nation University (Thailand)
American National University, United States
Florida National University, United States
National University (California), United States
National University School of Law, Washington D.C., United States
Guozijian, the National University for many imperial Chinese and Vietnamese dynasties

See also

National American University
National Louis University
National Autonomous University (disambiguation)
National Defence University (disambiguation)
National Pedagogic University (disambiguation)
National Technical University (disambiguation)